Sabro Korsvejskolen is a public state-owned school (Danish: Folkeskole) located in the Sabro suburb in the Aarhus Municipality of Denmark. It was established in 1964.

Organisation 
The school consists of a pre-school, primary and lower secondary school that teaches the full period of compulsory education from the ages of 6 to 16.

The school enrols some 500 students. The average class size is 15-20 students in the middle school and 10-17 students in the lower secondary school.

History 
The school is named after a small complex between two old city roads, Viborgvej and Stillingvej, North West of Aarhus. The school was inaugurated in 1964 under the name Sabro-Korsvejskolen, but was later renamed to Sabro Korsvejskolen, without the hyphen.

The school was meant to replace smaller schools in Lading, Skjoldelev, Fårup, Borum og Lyngby. Early in the planning process the more central city of Mundelstrup was considered, but not chosen.

Grade system 
In 2005-06 a new grade system was introduced, 7-trins-skalaen ("7-step-scale"; colloquially dubbed the 12-scale), designed to be compatible with the ECTS grading scale.

Municipality reform 
At the local government reform in 1970, part of Lading was moved into Hammel Municipality and the rest to the Aarhus Municipality. The original school community was abolished and the school controlled from Aarhus Municipality.

After a few years the city council of Hammel decided that the children from this municipality should stop going to school in Sabro and instead be transported to the Municipality's capital.

References

External links 

 Municipal statistics: NetBorger Kommunefakta, delivered from KMD aka Kommunedata (Municipal Data)
 Municipal mergers and neighbors: Eniro new municipalities map

Primary schools in Aarhus
Educational institutions established in 1964
1964 establishments in Denmark